Observation Point is a large bluff in Central Port Chalmers, New Zealand

Observation Point may also refer to:
Observation Point (Zion), a 6,507-foot elevation
Scenic viewpoint, a location where people view scenery
Data point, a set of at least one measurement
Observation post, a post where soldiers watch enemy movements